The 1985–86 Mississippi Valley State Delta Devils basketball team represented Mississippi Valley State University during the 1985–86 NCAA Division I men's basketball season. The Delta Devils, led by head coach Lafayette Stribling, played their home games at Harrison HPER Complex as members of the Southwestern Athletic Conference. The Delta Devils finished the season 20–11, 10–4 in SWAC play to finish in 3rd pace. They won the SWAC Basketball tournament to earn the conference's automatic bid into the 1986 NCAA tournament – the first appearance in school history. As the No. 16 seed in the East Region, the Delta Devils played a tough game before falling to No. 1 overall seed and eventual National runner-up Duke in the opening round, 85–78.

Roster

Schedule and results

|-
!colspan=9 style=| Regular season

|-
!colspan=9 style=| SWAC tournament

|-
!colspan=9 style=| 1986 NCAA tournament

References

Mississippi Valley State Delta Devils basketball seasons
Mississippi Valley State
Mississippi Valley State
Mississippi Valley
Mississippi Valley